The Passaic Valley Sewerage Commission (PVSC) is a regional wastewater utility located in Newark, New Jersey. Established in 1902, PVSC provides sewage treatment services to 1.5 million people in Bergen, Essex, Hudson, Union and Passaic Counties. The commission also provides environmental education programs to school districts in its service area.

The utility's treatment plant uses activated sludge secondary treatment technology, has a design capacity of 330 million gallons per day (MGD) and discharges to Newark Bay. In addition to processing the biosolids (sludge) from the Newark Bay plant, PVSC also processes liquid wastes (e.g. commercial waste, landfill leachate) and sludge from facilities outside its service area, including the Bergen County Utilities Authority.

References

External links 

1902 establishments in New Jersey
Buildings and structures in Newark, New Jersey
Environment of New Jersey
Infrastructure in New Jersey
Sewage treatment plants in the United States
State agencies of New Jersey